The men's doubles table tennis event was part of the table tennis programme and took place between December 4 and 6, at the Al-Arabi Indoor Hall.

Schedule
All times are Arabia Standard Time (UTC+03:00)

Results
Legend
WO — Won by walkover

Finals

Top half

Section 1

Section 2

Bottom half

Section 3

Section 4

References

 Results
 Official website

Table tennis at the 2006 Asian Games